Our Revolution is a political organization in the United States.

Our Revolution may also refer to:
Our Revolution (Sanders book), a book by Bernie Sanders published in 2016
Our Revolution (Trotsky book), a book by Leon Trotsky published in 1906

See also
Revolution (disambiguation)